Mount Hermon Female Sanctuary (18751924) in Clinton, Mississippi was a historically black institution of higher education for women.

History
Founded in 1875 by Sarah Ann Dickey, the school was patterned after Dickey's alma mater, Mount Holyoke Female Seminary (now Mount Holyoke College).  The school was funded in part by the Slater Fund for the Education of Freedman from its founding until 1891.

The seminary was eventually closed in 1924 by the American Missionary Association, which had its own college in Tougaloo, Mississippi.

Notable people
 Lou Singletary Bedford (1837–?), author, poet, editor

See also
Female seminary
Women's education in the United States

References

Historically black universities and colleges in the United States
Former women's universities and colleges in the United States
Defunct private universities and colleges in Mississippi
Education in Hinds County, Mississippi
Female seminaries in the United States
Educational institutions established in 1875
Educational institutions disestablished in 1924
History of women in Mississippi
1875 establishments in Mississippi